Santiago González and Vasek Pospisil were the defending champions; however, González decided not to participate.
Pospisil played alongside Nicholas Monroe, but they lost to Andre Begemann and Chris Eaton in the semifinals.
First seeds Rajeev Ram and Bobby Reynolds defeated second seeds Begemann and Eaton 6–3, 6–2, to claim this year's title.

Seeds

  Rajeev Ram /  Bobby Reynolds (champions)
  Andre Begemann /  Chris Eaton (final)
  Nicholas Monroe /  Vasek Pospisil (semifinals)
  Marcel Felder /  Paolo Lorenzi (quarterfinals)

Draw

Draw

References
 Main Draw

Torneo Internacional AGT - Doubles
2011 Doubles